The third round of 2023 AFC Asian Cup qualification was played from 8 to 14 June 2022 in six centralised venues. It was originally scheduled for 30 March 2021 to 29 March 2022, but the Asian Football Confederation (AFC) changed the dates on multiple occasions due to postponements of matches in the second round, impacted by the COVID-19 pandemic in Asia.

Format
A total of 24 teams (22 teams which advanced from the second round and two teams which advanced from the play-off round) participated in the third round to compete for the final 11 slots in the 2023 AFC Asian Cup. Since the 2023 former hosts China advanced to the third round of the 2022 FIFA World Cup qualifiers, the automatic slot for the hosts was no longer necessary.

The 24 teams were divided into six groups of four teams to play single round-robin matches in six centralised venues. The group winners and the best five runners-up across all groups qualified for the Asian Cup, where they were joined by China and by the 12 teams which qualified directly from the second round.

On 17 February 2022, The AFC announced the six countries that would be hosting the third round: India, Kuwait, Kyrgyzstan, Malaysia, Mongolia and Uzbekistan.

Qualified teams

Notes

Seeding
The seeding was based on the FIFA World Rankings at the time of the draw on 24 February 2022. Teams from the host countries were placed in a separate pot allotted for hosts member associations (MAs), although their final group positions reflected their original draw seeding.

Host Pot contained the teams from the host countries (group positions reflected their original draw seeding positions).
Pot 1 contained the teams ranked 1–6 (except Uzbekistan, Kyrgyz Republic, and India).
Pot 2 contained the teams ranked 7–12 (except Kuwait).
Pot 3 contained the teams ranked 13–18 (except Malaysia).
Pot 4 contained the teams ranked 19–24 (except Mongolia).

The 24 teams were drawn into six groups of four. Each group contained one team from the host pot and the remaining seeding pots, except for the original seeding pot of the host country.

The national teams which qualified are presented in bold.

Schedule

Groups

Group A

Group B

Group C

Group D

Group E

Group F

Ranking of runner-up teams

Goalscorers

Notes

See also
2022 FIFA World Cup qualification – AFC third round
2022 FIFA World Cup qualification – AFC fourth round
2023 AFC Asian Cup qualification

References

External links
 at the-AFC.com

Qual3
3
June 2022 sports events in Asia
Association football events curtailed due to the COVID-19 pandemic